Elections to the Cumbernauld and Kilsyth District Council took place in May 1992, alongside elections to the councils of Scotland's various other districts.

Aggregate results

References

1992 Scottish local elections